AIYF may refer to:

 Aberdeen International Youth Festival
 All India Youth Federation